Frost flowers are ice crystals commonly found growing on young sea ice and thin lake ice in cold, calm conditions. The ice crystals are similar to hoar frost, and are commonly seen to grow in patches around 3–4 cm in diameter. Frost flowers growing on sea ice have extremely high salinities and concentrations of other sea water chemicals and, because of their high surface area, are efficient releasers of these chemicals into the atmosphere.

Formation

Frost flowers are formed on new sea ice, on the open water leads (where the existing ice has split open) when the atmosphere is much colder than the underlying ice. Open water leads are formed by the winds, tides, and currents. These leads expose water near 0 °C to much colder air, which results in the rapid formation of ice. With the formation and growth of ice, salt is simultaneously pushed out, back into the ocean due to gravity (gravity drainage) as well as outward which forms brine channels extending to the surface. This results in high saline “surface skim” that is usually 5 °C to 10 °C warmer than the surrounding air forming new sea ice. Typically a temperature difference between the ice surface and the air of at least 15 °C is required, though this can be reduced if the air is very humid. In these conditions a layer of supersaturated vapour occurs due to the "surface skim" providing excess water vapor. As the warmer, wet air meets the overlying cold air it becomes supersaturated and condenses allowing small crystals to form a nucleus on the sea ice surface's imperfections and grow by vapor deposition. In general, frost flowers only form in relatively windless conditions; in high winds the supersaturated layer is scrubbed from the surface and blowing snow obscures the ice surface.

Frost flowers can grow and spread forming a dense concentration across the lead. On lake ice, frost flowers are effectively identical to hoar frost crystals. On sea ice, through surface tension and differences in concentration gradients, frost flowers that sit on brine-saturated surfaces wicks up the brine, increasing the bulk salinity, which leads to high salinity. The tips of mature frost flowers are less saline due to vapor deposition and the bulk salinity decreases at night due to hoarfrost accumulation as the temperature drops and new snow (they are very good at collecting snow) which also reduces their bulk salinity over time. Studies have been done on frost flowers and in one study in the ocean near Barrow, Alaska Alvarez-Aviles et al. (2008) found that the bulk salinities of the frost flowers ranged from 16 ppt to 105 ppt with an average of about 62 ppt. (approximately three times more salty than sea water).

Frost flowers are most commonly found on young sea ice in polar regions as the large temperature differences between the ice and air are suitable for growth. When the ice grows too thick, the upper surface of the ice cools down and frost flowers no longer grow. This means that frost flowers typically only grow in the first few days of new ice coverage.

Morphology

Temperature, specifically the temperature at the surface of the ice that is not in the vicinity of the frost flowers, has a direct impact on the morphology as well as the thickness and absorbency of the ice, snow coverage and the blanket of frost flowers. The shape of frost flowers changes when the air temperature or the degree of supersaturation changes during the growth process by changing the crystal tips. The level of supersaturation determines the general formation, size and shape of the frost flower. In lower supersaturation, the tip of the frost flower will be faceted and side branches will form creating a branched-like crystal, resembling a tree, where in higher supersaturation the tip shape of the main branch will be rounded forming a star-like crystal without side branches. The ice crystals in frost flowers are usually dendritic but similarly to hoar frost can grow in rod-like morphologies. When warm brine is wicked up onto the ice crystals, it can also give the frost flower a 'clumped' appearance as the facets of the ice crystals are partly melted.

Chemistry 
Frost flowers are complex in microstructural chemistry due to many different conditions, like air, temperature, chemical concentrations in the water, surface skim, humidity, and precipitation influencing their formation and growth. An important part of their formation is the fractionation of sodium and sulfate in respects to chloride during precipitation of the salts. When the temperature decreases brine rejection increases and the channels become more and more concentrated, especially at the surface. When the salts begin the precipitate out of the ice, it changes the relative ion concentrations available in liquid water and in the frost flowers. Temperatures below -8 °C there is an increase loss of sodium and sulfate in relation to a decreasing temperature resulting in a depletion of aerosol from frost flowers at such temperatures in contrast to other ions. Frost flowers aerosol will have a higher sodium to sulfate ratio in comparison to aerosol from seawater because sulfate has a greater proportion being removed than sodium when mirabilite (Na2SO4 · 10H2O) precipitates. Frost flowers have a high concentration, typically 2 to 3 times greater, of bromide ions than found in seawater which is proportional to the salinity in the frost flowers. If the temperature were low enough for the sodium chloride that is present in the brine or frost flowers to freeze out, then the bromide may become readily available. Ice surface temperatures below -22 °C start to precipitate out sodium chloride and even lower temperatures other ions will precipitate out, but with surface ice temperature that low frost flowers cannot form, so it is unlikely that there will be depleted sodium chloride.

Aerosol release

Frost flowers have attracted interest as a possible source of polar atmospheric aerosol. High chemical concentrations and the extended surface area may facilitate efficient release into the atmosphere. In particular studies have shown that abundance of frost flowers can be linked to high concentrations of tropospheric bromine monoxide causing tropospheric ozone depletion events, and higher quantities of airborne sea-salt particles. The study Obbard et al. (2009) addressing the concern of bromine, which may be causing the ozone depletion, showed no conclusive evidence that the frost flower aerosol is causing a significant contribution of bromine enrichment into the atmosphere. Furthermore, the study showed that there was bromine depletion as well as enrichment relative to chloride in frost flowers.

Arctic "sea meadows"

On Sept. 2, 2009, a University of Washington biology team sailing back from the North Pole encountered these little flowery things growing on the frozen sea "like a meadow spreading off in all directions. Every available surface was covered with them." When allowed to melt, the one to two milliliters of water recovered was found to hold about a million bacteria. Professor Jody Deming believes that as the poles warm, there will be more and more of these meadows, because there will be more and more open sea that turns to thin ice in winter, and her team is eager to discover what the bacteria living in the frost flowers are doing.

See also
Frost

References 

Frost and rime
Hydrology